Sangre Grande Regional Complex is a multi-use stadium in Sangre Grande, Trinidad and Tobago.  It is currently used mostly for football matches and is the home stadium of North East Stars.  The stadium holds 7,100 people.

Football venues in Trinidad and Tobago
Sangre Grande